Frances Elizabeth Cox (1812—1879) was an English translator of German hymns. She was the daughter of Mr. George V. Cox. In 1841, her translations were published as Sacred Hymns from the German by Pickering which contained 49 translations together with biographical notes on the German authors. The second edition was published in 1864 as Hymns from the German by  Rivingtons. The translations were increased to 56, those of 1841 being revised, and with additional notes. The best known of her translations are "Jesus lives! no longer [thy terrors] now" ; and "Who are these like stars appearing?" A few other translations and original hymns have been contributed by Miss Cox to the magazines; but they have not been gathered together into a volume.

References 

1879 deaths
1812 births
English translators